Braian Ezequiel Cufré (born 15 December 1996) is an Argentine professional footballer who plays as a left-back for Major League Soccer club New York City FC, on loan from RCD Mallorca.

Club career

Vélez Sarsfield
Cufré is a youth exponent from Vélez Sarsfield. On 18 October 2015, he made his first team debut in a league game against CA Lanús in a 1–0 away win. He played the full game. He scored is first goal on 28 October 2018 in a 1–0 win against Belgrano.

Mallorca
On 28 September 2020, Cufré was officially announced as Mallorca's  newest arrival, he signed for four seasons. He contributed with one goal in 29 league appearances during the campaign, as his club achieved promotion to La Liga.

On 11 August 2021, Cufré was loaned to Málaga CF for one year.

On 3 February 2023, Cufré signed on loan with New York City FC until the end of the Major League Soccer season with an option to make the transfer permanent.

Career statistics

Club

References

External links
 
 
 Braian Cufré at ESPN Deportes 

1996 births
Living people
Sportspeople from Mar del Plata
Argentine footballers
Association football defenders
Argentine Primera División players
Club Atlético Vélez Sarsfield footballers
Segunda División players
RCD Mallorca players
Málaga CF players
New York City FC players
Argentine expatriate footballers
Argentine expatriate sportspeople in Spain
Expatriate footballers in Spain